Spelling Television Inc. was an American television production company that went through several name changes. It was originally called Aaron Spelling Productions, then Spelling Entertainment Inc. and eventually part of Spelling Entertainment Group. The company produced popular shows such as The Love Boat, Dynasty, Beverly Hills, 90210, 7th Heaven, Melrose Place and Charmed. The company was founded by television producer Aaron Spelling on October 25, 1965. The company is currently an in-name-only unit of CBS Studios. A related company, Spelling-Goldberg Productions, co-existed during a portion of the same time period and produced other well-known shows such as Family, Charlie's Angels, Starsky & Hutch, and Fantasy Island but these series are not part of the modern day library now owned by Paramount Global. Another related company, The Douglas S. Cramer Company co-existed during a portion of the same time period (held by Douglas S. Cramer, who held the position as Executive VP), produced shows like Wonder Woman, Joe and Sons, and Bridget Loves Bernie and television films like Dawn: Portrait of a Teenage Runaway.

Background
On October 25, 1965, after his exit from Four Star Television as a staff writer prior to becoming a producer, Aaron Spelling formed his own company with Danny Thomas, Thomas-Spelling Productions.

Thomas-Spelling Productions was a television production company formed by comedian Danny Thomas and producer Aaron Spelling on April 15, 1966, as a partnership with 24 properties. The company adapted its name by July 18, 1966, when it announced the financial involvement of ABC with its first show, Range (later Rango), a half-hour comedy western starring Tim Conway. ABC also pick up another show for a pilot, just in an outline treatment, in The Guns of Will Sonnett. Thomas-Spelling Productions' active operations ended with the last season of The Mod Squad in 1972, with Spelling forming a new partnership with Leonard Goldberg, called Spelling-Goldberg Productions.

History
Aaron Spelling, who was still involved with Thomas-Spelling Productions, signed an exclusive deal with ABC via Aaron Spelling Productions for TV series and feature films.

In the late 1970s/early 1980s, Spelling was called king in television. In 1982, Aaron Spelling Productions struck a deal with Warner Bros. Television Distribution for worldwide syndication rights to future Spelling productions. In 1984, Spelling had seven shows for the ABC television network, accounting for one-third their prime time schedule. This outweighed other production companies by a large margin, leading many industry insiders to dub ABC as "Aaron's Broadcasting Company". Spelling himself was never amused with this name.

Aaron Spelling Productions went public in 1986 after raising $80 million. In May 1987, Spelling decided to expand into feature production, with five projects already in the works for different studios, and four projects ASP is heading up for the development slate. On August 17, 1987, Spelling extended its contract with ABC for three more years. On September 28, 1987, Spelling's arrangement with ABC became non-exclusive as it was signed a deal to other networks. In 1988, Aaron Spelling Productions acquired Laurel Entertainment and most of the Taft Entertainment Company, including Worldvision Enterprises, Inc. All three companies became part of Spelling Entertainment Inc. – though Worldvision was the only Taft division to continue operating. The sale was completed on March 1, 1989. In 1990, the company started Spelling Films International as a distributor for feature films such as feature film financing.

In the early 1990s Beverly Hills, 90210 and Melrose Place helped propel Fox even higher and reach a new generation of young teen viewers. Sunset Beach was Spelling's first and only foray into the daytime soap opera genre and whilst short lived, was incredibly popular abroad. Also in the 1990s the WB was launched and their longest running, highest rated and most successful show during their time in operation was 7th Heaven for ten seasons. By 2006, another new network, The CW, used 7th Heaven in their first season in operation as the newest network; 7th Heaven, in fact, turned out to be the last network broadcast series produced by Spelling Television. Spelling's ABC, Fox, and WB shows were enormously successful for the company and they wasted no time entering into the world of merchandise in the 1980s and 1990s. The company also was one of the first production companies to actively run a website for a show they produced, when the internet was just taking off in the 1990s. The website was for Melrose Place.

Spelling Entertainment Inc. was acquired by Charter Company on April 6, 1991. On March 31, 1992, Spelling and Charter announced a merger agreement. On October 5, 1992, Charter changed its name to Spelling Entertainment Group Inc. and updated its NYSE ticker symbol to SP. On October 5, 1993, Blockbuster, Inc. acquired a controlling stake in Spelling Entertainment Group. On April 28, 1994, Spelling Entertainment acquired Republic Pictures for $100 million.

In August 1994, a syndicated package of shows was produced by Spelling TV for Worldvision's Spelling Premiere Network. These shows included 22 episodes of Robin's Hoods, 13 episodes of Heaven Help Us, and 9 episodes of University Hospital, Heaven'''s midseason replacement.

Viacom acquisition
On September 29, 1994, Blockbuster merged with Viacom. Blockbuster by then owned 67% of Spelling Entertainment. After the merger, Spelling Entertainment integrated Worldvision into their Republic Pictures unit, thus dismantling Worldvision as a production company. Worldvision distribution functions continued until 1999, when it was folded into Paramount Domestic Television that year and assumed distribution functions (Viacom had bought Paramount Communications – formerly Gulf+Western – the parent of Paramount Pictures and its television division, in 1994).

In 1995, Viacom attempted to sell its then-78% share of Spelling. One reason was that they wanted to recoup the debt incurred from buying Paramount Communications. Also, they felt that the operations of Spelling Television was too similar to its Paramount Television division. Potential bids came from PolyGram, New World Entertainment, and News Corporation. These plans were called off in 1996 as Viacom could not find the perfect bidder. The remainder of Spelling Entertainment was then acquired by Viacom on June 23, 1999.

Before the merger with Viacom, most of Spelling's shows were distributed by Worldvision, with older Spelling shows distributed by several others including Warner Bros. Television and 20th Television.

The company's first home was a suite of offices on the old Warners lot in Hollywood. A newer base followed when the company was an original anchor tenant of the Wilshire Courtyard buildings in LA's revitalized Miracle Mile district. Aaron Spelling was said to have loved his old office's 1970s shag carpet so much that he had it removed piece by piece and installed in the new office. The company grew so large with so many different entities that at one point it leased all three top floors of the 5700 building and held additional office space across the street. Aaron Spelling had one of the largest offices in Hollywood for a single executive. Upon the company's exit, media companies from all over Los Angeles vied for the desirable office suites; the newly formed The CW briefly looked at the offices when considering a location for the new start-up network. Spelling Television briefly moved to smaller offices in Santa Monica in 2006.

By 2000, Aaron Spelling remained active and involved as CEO until his death in 2006. Company president Jonathan Levin handled day-to-day operations and longtime Spelling producing partner, E. Duke Vincent helped guide the successful production company. In late 2005, Spelling Television had downsized its staff and signed into a pod development and production deal with Paramount Television, and moved its employees there to Paramount.

CBS/ViacomCBS/Paramount Global era
Spelling Television was eventually downsized even further and became a small "production shingle" under CBS Paramount Television (now CBS Studios), a division of CBS Corporation (now Paramount Global), with a small staff. After Aaron Spelling's June 2006 death, the following May saw Spelling Television shut down and becoming an in-name-only unit of CBS Studios.

Spelling's library today
The CBS/Viacom split essentially resulted in the de-merger of Spelling and Republic. CBS retained the rights to the television side of the Spelling/Republic library, while Viacom (Paramount) retained the theatrical and direct-to-video sides of the library.

Currently, all television programs that were produced or acquired by Spelling Television are distributed by CBS Media Ventures.

The Spelling Television company logo and series were seen on broadcast television for the last time during the rerun of the 7th Heaven series finale on September 16, 2007. The Spelling logo continues to appear on the covers of DVD releases of the Spelling library except for those shows owned outright by Sony Pictures Television, and shows that were not originally produced by Spelling although eventually later acquired, such as Bonanza.

In late 2008, some of Spelling Television's productions, including Beverly Hills, 90210, Melrose Place, Twin Peaks, and The Love Boat began streaming full episodes online through CBS's website under the Classics page.

In 2015, CBS owned Pop formerly called TVGN, airs many of these shows, while formally the CBS All Access and currently the Paramount+ streaming service and the CBS portal on Hulu distribute the shows online.

In December 2019, CBS Corporation and Viacom remerged into a single entity under the name ViacomCBS (and eventually renamed into Paramount Global), which reunited Spelling library and Republic library full-circles back.

Spelling Entertainment Group

Before the full acquisition by Viacom in 1999 (where only Spelling Television would be left standing as a separate operating unit), Spelling Entertainment Group's holdings consisted of the following:
 Spelling Television and most of the libraries of ancestor companies (excluding Spelling-Goldberg Productions properties which were sold off to Columbia Pictures Television, modern day Sony Pictures Television, and the earliest telemovies up until 1973, which is owned by Disney–ABC Domestic Television)
 Big Ticket Entertainment launched in 1994 (now a unit of CBS Studios)
 Spelling Daytime Television launched as a separate division for daytime production based at NBC.
 Torand Productions
 Laurel Entertainment, Inc.
 Spelling Films
 Republic Pictures including:
 much of its own library of films and in-house TV series
 The inherited holdings of National Telefilm Associates (NTA), which itself includes:
 It's a Wonderful Life Most of Paramount's own classic short subject library including the pre-October 1950 Famous Studios short subject library
 Some early pre-1952 United Artists material (including High Noon)
 Pre-1973 NBC Films shows, such as Get Smart, The High Chaparral and Bonanza Worldvision Enterprises acquired in 1989:
 The Sunn Classic Pictures television and Titus Productions libraries
 The Taft International Pictures and Taft Entertainment Television libraries, including the game show Blackout Majority of the QM Productions library.
 Pre-1973 ABC Films shows, as well as U.S. television rights to NBC's Little House on the Prairie (premiered in 1974)
 The television rights to most of the Carolco Pictures library
 TeleUNO, Latin American cable network launched in 1993
 Virgin Interactive (91%, acquired in 1994)

In 1998, Spelling divested in several assets in an attempt to focus solely on television. Spelling Films was shut down, as well as their home video arm (which operated under the Republic brand). In May 1998, TeleUNO was acquired by Sony Pictures. In September 1998, Spelling licensed the North American home video rights to its library to Artisan Entertainment, initially for seven years. That same month, Virgin Interactive's software development assets were sold to Electronic Arts.

After the late 2005 corporate split between Viacom and CBS Corporation, some of the above have gone to each company. Films mostly went to Viacom's Paramount Pictures unit and television with CBS Corporation's CBS Television Distribution unit until the 2019 re-merger, while the Selznick films went to the various territorial television syndication divisions of The Walt Disney Company/ABC, as ABC itself holds the rights to the Selznick films.

As for DVD rights, these are also split (and later reunited again):
 CBS Home Entertainment owns worldwide DVD rights to the television library, with distribution handled by Paramount Home Entertainment (one exception being the United Kingdom rights to Twin Peaks, which, due to prior contracts, are handled by Universal Pictures Home Entertainment through its Universal Playback label). Another exception is Holocaust, a miniseries Spelling acquired in the Taft Entertainment acquisition - CBS has licensed DVD rights to various other companies outside the US, while Paramount owns the United States rights.
 In the United States, a few of the films (most notably It's a Wonderful Life'') have DVD rights owned by Paramount, but the rest were distributed by Lionsgate Home Entertainment, successor to previous Spelling/Republic video licensee Artisan Entertainment, but was shifted to Olive Films. In the rest of the world, DVD rights to the films are owned by various other companies (for example, Universal in the UK, and Paramount themselves in France and Region 4).

Past names
 Aaron Spelling Productions (1965–1988)
 Spelling Entertainment Inc. (1988–1992)
 Spelling Entertainment Group (1992–1999)

See also
 Aaron Spelling
 Spelling-Goldberg Productions
 Worldvision Enterprises
 Republic Pictures

Notes and references

Television production companies of the United States
Entertainment companies based in California
Companies based in Los Angeles
American companies established in 1965
American companies disestablished in 2007
Entertainment companies established in 1965
Entertainment companies disestablished in 2007
Mass media companies established in 1965
Mass media companies disestablished in 2007
1965 establishments in California
2007 disestablishments in California
1994 mergers and acquisitions
Paramount Global subsidiaries
Predecessors of CBS Studios